Matsubara Station is the name of two train stations in Japan.

 Matsubara Station (Nagasaki) - (松原駅) in Nagasaki Prefecture
 Matsubara Station (Tokyo) - (松原駅) in Tokyo